Bishovia is a genus of flowering plants in the family Asteraceae.

Genus is named for Dr. Luther Earl Bishop.

 Species
 Bishovia boliviensis R.M.King & H.Rob.	- Bolivia
 Bishovia mikaniifolia (B.L.Rob.) R.M.King & H.Rob. - Argentina

References

Flora of South America
Eupatorieae
Asteraceae genera